Amos Serem (born 28 August 2002) is a Kenyan athlete who specializes in the steeplechase running. He was the gold medallist at the World Athletics U20 Championships in 2021.

Personal bests

References

External links 

 Amos Serem at World Athletics

2002 births
Living people
Kenyan male steeplechase runners
World Athletics U20 Championships winners
Athletes (track and field) at the 2022 Commonwealth Games
Commonwealth Games bronze medallists for Kenya
Commonwealth Games medallists in athletics
Medallists at the 2022 Commonwealth Games